Ascutney is an unincorporated village and census-designated place (CDP) in the town of Weathersfield, Windsor County, Vermont, United States.  It is located in the northeastern section of Weathersfield, in the portion of that town adjacent to Mount Ascutney, after which the village is named. As of the 2010 census, the population of the CDP was 540.

Geography
Ascutney is located at geographical coordinates 43° 24′ 25″ North, 72° 24′ 27″ West (43.407059, -72.407562). The southern flanks of Mount Ascutney rise to the north of the CDP, with its summit in the neighboring towns of Windsor and West Windsor.

U.S. Route 5 runs north–south through Ascutney, intersected by Vermont routes 12 and 131 at the center of the CDP. Interstate 91 forms the western boundary of the CDP and serves Ascutney by Exit 8. From Ascutney, Route 12 crosses the Connecticut River into Claremont, New Hampshire.

References

External links
 Town of Weathersfield

Census-designated places in Vermont
Census-designated places in Windsor County, Vermont
Vermont populated places on the Connecticut River
Weathersfield, Vermont
Vermont placenames of Native American origin